A debt jubilee is a clearance of debt from public records across a wide sector or a nation. Such a jubilee was proposed as a solution to debt incurred or anticipated during the COVID-19 recession. The American economist Michael Hudson is a proponent of a debt jubilee, writing in a Washington Post op-ed that it was an alternative to a depression. Similarly, anthropologist David Graeber pointed to kings' historical use of debt jubilees during regime changes to suggest that a debt jubilee would have been an appropriate response to the 2008 financial crisis. Australian economist Steve Keen is a proponent of debt jubilee. To deal with debt we have to address the trillions of outstanding bad debts. Over the past decade, the world’s central banks have sent interest rates to record lows as their response.

See also
 Jubilee (biblical)
 Seisachtheia
 Write-down

References

Further reading
 
 

Jubilee
Public records